Prospect is an unincorporated community in Jasper County, in the U.S. state of Georgia.

History
A variant name was "Eudora". Eudora was a name derived from the Greek meaning "generous gifts". A post office called Eudora was established in 1874, and remained in operation until 1902.

References

Unincorporated communities in Jasper County, Georgia
Unincorporated communities in Georgia (U.S. state)